Kunihar is a valley town  in the Solan district of the Indian state of Himachal Pradesh, which is also known as "Hatkot" and "Choti Vilayat." Kunihar is situated, alongside Kuni Rivulet,a small river or Khad in shape of garland or Har so is the name.

Location 
Kunihar is situated 42 km from Shimla (going on the way to the Jubarhatti Airport) and 40 km from Solan (going via Subathu).

History
Kunihar was founded in 1154 by Abhoj Dev Akhnoor in Jammu. . The rulers of the state used the title of 'Thakur'.

Rulers
The rulers bore the title of Thakur.

       1815 -        1816  Mungri Das
       1816 -        1866  Kishen Singh
       1866 -        1905  Tegh Singh
       1905 - 15 Aug 1947  Hardev Singh.

Gallery

References

Valleys of Himachal Pradesh
Buildings and structures in Solan district
Forts in Himachal Pradesh